"Ain't No Nigga" is the second single from the American rapper Jay-Z's first album, Reasonable Doubt, and is featured on the soundtrack to the 1996 Eddie Murphy movie The Nutty Professor. It was released on March 19, 1996. The track features Foxy Brown, and uncredited vocals by Jaz-O.

Background
The song's beat is produced by Big Jaz who samples "Seven Minutes of Funk" by the funk band The Whole Darn Family. The song's chorus was sung by Jaz-O, and interpolates "Ain't No Woman (Like the One I've Got)" by the Four Tops. The "Ain't No Nigga" single goes under the clean alias "Ain't No Playa". Foxy Brown was 17 at the time when the song was recorded and the music video was filmed.

Citing the funky production and lyrics about unfaithful relationships, Spence D. of IGN.com describes it as "one of the better opposite sex rap duets ever laid on wax."

"Ain't No Nigga" is cited as playing a significant role in securing Jay-Z's record deal with Def Jam. According to Sony BMG A&R Nick Raphael, "Will Socolof of Freeze Records sent me a CD and a video and said to me, "This guy is incredible, but he needs a bigger label to take over. Are you interested?" The record he sent to me was "Ain't No Nigga" and I went crazy, thinking that I had to sign him!"

Music video
The music video of the song, which was shot in Miami, starts with a scene similar to a scene of the film Scarface. It is the second time the album references the film, the first with the start of "Can't Knock the Hustle". The music video features a cameo by The Notorious B.I.G.

Formats and track listings

Vinyl
A-Side
 "Ain't No Playa (Rae & Christian Mix)"
 "Ain't No Playa (Original Mix)"
B-Side
 "Ain't No Playa (Fresh to Def Mix)"
 "Ain't No Playa (New York Street Mix)"

Vinyl (remixes)
A-Side
 "Ain't No Nigga (Ganja Kru Mix)"
B-Side
 "Can't Knock the Hustle (Desired State Remix)"

Charts

Weekly charts

See also
List of songs recorded by Jay-Z

References

1996 singles
Jay-Z songs
Foxy Brown (rapper) songs
Songs written by Dennis Lambert
Songs written by Brian Potter (musician)
Songs written by Jay-Z
Songs written by Jaz-O
Song recordings produced by Jaz-O
1996 songs
Roc-A-Fella Records singles
Songs written by Foxy Brown (rapper)